Mibaran (also Romanized as Mībarān and Meybarān; also known as Meyvarān and Mīvarān) is a village in Khorram Dasht Rural District, Kamareh District, Khomeyn County, Markazi Province, Iran. At the 2006 census, its population was 11, in 4 families.

References 

Populated places in Khomeyn County